Gastrodia molloyi is a species of plant in the family Orchidaceae. It is endemic to New Zealand. It was first formally described in 2016 by Carlos Adolfo Lehnebach and Jeremy Rolfe and the description was published in the journal Phytotaxa. The specific epithet (molloyi) honours the New Zealand botanist, Brian Molloy.

References

External links 

molloyi
Endangered plants
Endemic orchids of New Zealand
Plants described in 2016